Wombwell F.C. was an English football club located in Wombwell, Barnsley, South Yorkshire.

History
The club was formed in 1920 and was  the second senior team to represent the village, after Wombwell Town became defunct in the 1900s. Wombwell entered the Yorkshire League and the FA Cup in their inaugural season. After finishing in second place in their first season they moved to the Midland League.

Wombwell spent 12 seasons in the Midland League, in which time they won the Sheffield & Hallamshire Senior Cup and reached the 1st Round of the FA Cup in 1930, being knocked out by Wellington Town the current Telford Utd, 3-0 after a replay. In 1934, with debts mounting, the club withdrew from the Midland League and dissolved.

League and cup history

Honours

League
None

Cup
Sheffield & Hallamshire Senior Cup
Winners: 1922–23

Records
Best FA Cup performance: 1st Round, 1930–31

References

Defunct football clubs in England
Defunct football clubs in South Yorkshire
Yorkshire Football League
Midland Football League (1889)
Association football clubs established in 1920
1920 establishments in England
Association football clubs disestablished in 1934
1934 disestablishments in England